D46 may refer to:
 Cisitalia D46, an Italian racing car
 D46 motorway (Czech Republic)
 D46 road (Croatia)
 , a Danae-class cruiser of the Royal Navy
 , a W-class destroyer of the Royal Navy
 Myelodysplastic syndrome
 Semi-Slav Defense, a chess opening
 String Quartet No. 4 (Schubert), by Franz Schubert